St. Michael the Archangel Parish was a parish of the Catholic Church in Lynn, Massachusetts in the United States. It was one of the Polish-American Roman Catholic parishes in New England in the Archdiocese of Boston, established in 1905 to serve Polish immigrants in the area. The parish was closed June 25, 2006.

Bibliography 
 Our Lady of Czestochowa Parish - Centennial 1893-1993
 The Official Catholic Directory in USA

References

External links 
 Roman Catholic Archdiocese of Boston
 Closed and Merged Parishes

See also 
St. Michael’s parishioners gathered at shuttered church for solemn holy day in Lynn

1906 establishments in Massachusetts
2006 disestablishments in Massachusetts
Religious organizations disestablished in 2006
Buildings and structures in Lynn, Massachusetts
Roman Catholic churches completed in 1906
Roman Catholic parishes of Archdiocese of Boston
Polish-American Roman Catholic parishes in Massachusetts